Noël Debroy Jones  (25 December 1932 – 28 August 2009) was an Anglican bishop.  He was the Bishop of Sodor and Man in the Church of England.

Early life and education
Jones was born on 25 December 1932 in Monmouthshire, Wales. He was educated at Haberdashers' West Monmouth School, then an all-boys grammar school in Pontypool, Torfaen. He studied at St David's College, Lampeter and trained for ordination at Wells Theological College.

Ordained ministry
Jones was ordained in the Church in Wales as a deacon in 1955 and as a priest in 1956. He held two curacies in the Diocese of Monmouth: at St James' Church, Tredegar (1955 to 1957) and at the Church of St Mark, Newport (1957 to 1960). He was the vicar of Kano in Nigeria from 1960 to 1962.

Military service
In 1962, Jones joined the Royal Navy as a chaplain and was deployed to Brunei and Borneo. He also completed a commando course prior to service in Aden with 42 Commando in 1967.  He served in Saudi Arabia and as Staff Chaplain at the Ministry of Defence. In 1983, he was named an Honorary Chaplain to The Queen. In 1984, he was succeeded in this post by Ray Jones. The same year, he became Chaplain of the Fleet and Archdeacon for the Royal Navy, as well being made a Companion of the Order of the Bath.

Episcopal ministry
In 1989 Jones left the navy and was appointed Bishop of Sodor and Man.  During his time as bishop he had an ex officio seat in the Legislative Council and was a member of the Department of Education and the War Pensions Committee as well as being a trustee of King William's College. In 2003 he stood down as the diocesan bishop.

Views
Jones belonged to the Traditional Anglo-Catholic tradition of the Church of England. He was never a member of Forward in Faith, a traditionalist organization operating within Anglicanism. He was opposed to the ordination of women to the priesthood.

Later life
Jones died on 28 August 2009.

References

1932 births
People from Monmouthshire
2009 deaths
Manx people
Alumni of the University of Wales, Lampeter
Church of England archdeacons (military)
Bishops of Sodor and Man
Companions of the Order of the Bath
Chaplains of the Fleet
Honorary Chaplains to the Queen
20th-century Church of England bishops
21st-century Church of England bishops
People educated at West Monmouth School
Deans of Peel
Alumni of Wells Theological College